The Tobabe Formation is a geologic formation in Panama. The conglomerates and sandstones preserve fossils dating back to the Messinian period.

Fossil content 
The formation has provided the following fossils:
 Hepatus biformis
 Iliacantha panamanica
 Leucosilia bananensis
 Portunus gabbi
 Raninoides cf. benedicti
 Thoe asperoides
 ?Balaenopteroidea indet.

See also 
 List of fossiliferous stratigraphic units in Panama

References

Bibliography 
 

Geologic formations of Panama
Neogene Panama
Messinian
Conglomerate formations
Sandstone formations
Beach deposits
Paleontology in Panama
Formations